was a noted Japanese author. He studied French literature at Keio University, and won the 61st Akutagawa Prize in 1969 for Fukaikawa (Deep River), the 37th Yomiuri Prize in 1985 for Kaizu, and the 50th Noma Literary Prize in 1997 for Kodamashu.

References 

1928 births
2001 deaths
Japanese writers
Akutagawa Prize winners
Yomiuri Prize winners
20th-century novelists